The Catalonia national futsal team represents Catalonia in international futsal competitions organized by AMF and UEFS. It is controlled by the Catalonia Futsal Federation.

In 2006 they were the runners-up in the UEFS Championship.

Tournament records
AMF World Cup record

UEFS European Championship record

Current squad
(2010 UEFS Futsal Championship)

Coach : Juan Antonio Fernández

 In the 2007 AMF Futsal Men's World Cup, the players were Daniel Asensio Pérez, Osvald Casadesús, Juan Carlos Nieto, Israel Martínez, Joan Collboni, Isidoro Vargas, Antonio Manuel Matamoros, Javier Sánchez, Juan José Pavo, David Beltran, Llorenç Tarrés and José Manuel Lago.

See also
Catalonia women's national futsal team
Futsal in Catalonia

References

External links
FCFS Catalonia Federation of Futsal

Futsal in Catalonia
European national futsal teams
Futsal